Mouthfuls is the second album by American folk-rock band Fruit Bats, released in 2003.

Track listing

Fruit Bats (band) albums
2003 albums
Sub Pop albums